The 1973 World Fencing Championships were held in Gothenburg, Sweden.

Medal table

Medal summary

Men's events

Women's events

References

FIE Results

World Fencing Championships
F
1973 in Swedish sport
International sports competitions in Gothenburg
1973 in fencing
1970s in Gothenburg